Rondebosch railway station is a Metrorail station on the Southern Line, serving the suburb of Rondebosch in Cape Town.

The station has two side platforms and two tracks; the station building is at ground level on the eastern side of the tracks. The station is also served by Golden Arrow Bus Services.

Notable places nearby
 University of Cape Town
 Rondebosch Common
 Diocesan College
 Groote Schuur Estate

Rondebosch
Railway stations in Cape Town
Metrorail Western Cape stations